Earl Godfrey (born 20 August 1961) is a Bermudian former cyclist. He competed in the individual road race event at the 1984 Summer Olympics.

References

External links
 

1961 births
Living people
Bermudian male cyclists
Olympic cyclists of Bermuda
Cyclists at the 1984 Summer Olympics
Place of birth missing (living people)